Sterling Heights High School (SHHS) is a public high school in Sterling Heights, Michigan, United States. It serves  students in grades 9-12 for the Warren Consolidated Schools.

Academics
The 2020 U.S. News & World Report survey of high schools ranked Sterling Heights 6,162nd nationally and 214th in Michigan.

Demographics
The demographic breakdown of the 1,472 students enrolled for 2018-19 was:
Male - 50.7%
Female - 49.3%
Native American/Alaskan - 0.1%
Asian - 9.8%
Black - 10.9%
Hispanic - 2.0%
Native Hawaiian/Pacific islanders - >0.1%
White - 76.2%
Multiracial - 0.8%

69.1% of the students were eligible for free or reduced-cost lunch.

Athletics
The Sterling Heights Stallions compete in the Macomb Area Conference. School colors are black and gold. The following Michigan High School Athletic Association (MHSAA) sanctioned sports are offered:

Baseball (boys) 
Basketball (girls and boys) 
Bowling (girls and boys) 
Competitive cheerleading (girls) 
Cross country (girls and boys) 
Football (boys) 
Golf (boys) 
Lacrosse (boys) 
Soccer (girls and boys) 
Softball (girls) 
Swim and dive (girls and boys) 
Tennis (girls and boys) 
Track and field (girls and boys) 
Volleyball (girls) 
Wrestling (boys)

Notable alumni
Dave Borkowski, Major League Baseball (MLB) pitcher
Mark Hackel, politician
Karen A. Page, Jame Beard Award-winning author 
Larry Polec, Michigan State Basketball
Tom Stanton, New York Times-bestselling author

References

External links

Warren Consolidated Schools website

Public high schools in Michigan
Educational institutions established in 1971
Schools in Macomb County, Michigan
1971 establishments in Michigan
Sterling Heights, Michigan